C. dubia may refer to:

 Calochlaena dubia. a fern species
 Centaurea dubia, the Tyrol knapweed, a perennial plant species
 Cercomela dubia, the sombre chat, a bird species found in Ethiopia and Somalia
 Ceriodaphnia dubia, a species of water flea in the class Branchiopoda
 Clathrina dubia, a sponge species
 Clausilia dubia, a species of small, very elongate, left-handed air-breathing land snail species
 Colias dubia, the dwarf clouded yellow, a small butterfly species found in India
 Coursetia dubia, a legume species found only in Ecuador

See also
 Dubia (disambiguation)